Elizabeth Davenport McKune (born November 15, 1947 in Detroit, Michigan) is a Career Foreign Service Officer who served as the United States Ambassador to Qatar from 1998 until 2001. She retired in 2006.  In 2007, she became Executive Director of the Sultan Qaboos Cultural Center (SQCC) in Washington, D.C.

Early life 

McKune's parents are Colonel Clarence M. Davenport, Jr. (a West Point graduate) and Yolande Davenport (née Bradfield - a National Institute of Mental Health psychiatric social worker).

Education 

 B.A., Carleton College, Minnesota, 1970
 M.A., Johns Hopkins School of Advanced International Studies 1972
 National War College, with distinction, 1993

References 

Carleton College alumni
Paul H. Nitze School of Advanced International Studies alumni
National War College alumni
Ambassadors of the United States to Qatar
1947 births
Living people
American women ambassadors
United States Foreign Service personnel
20th-century American diplomats
21st-century American diplomats
20th-century American women
21st-century American women